Pyramidalis, pyramidal in Latin, may refer to:
 Pyramidalis muscle,  a small and triangular muscle, anterior to the Rectus abdominis, and contained in the rectus sheath in human anatomy
 Pyramidalis nasi, a small pyramidal slip of muscle deep to the superior orbital nerve, artery and vein
 Ulmus procera 'Pyramidalis', an English elm cultivar
 a rosemary cultivar